His Grace was born to Mr. K. T. Thomas and Mrs. Aleyamma Thomas on the 3rd of April, 1938 in the Kizhakkethalackal family at Puthencavu, Chengannur, Alappuzha Dist. He was the grandson of Kizhakkethalackal Thoma Kathanar and the nephew of the late Geevarghese Mar Philoxenos (Puthencavil Kochuthirumeni), Thomas Mar Athanasios is Metropolitan of Chengannur Orthodox Diocese of Malankara Orthodox Syrian Church.

References

1952 births
Living people
Malankara Orthodox Syrian Church bishops